Italy competed at the 1954 European Athletics Championships in Bern, Switzerland, from 25 to 29 August 1954.

Medalists

Top eight

Men

Women

See also
 Italy national athletics team

References

External links
 EAA official site

Italy at the European Athletics Championships
Nations at the 1954 European Athletics Championships
1954 in Italian sport